Kumgang or Geumgang may refer to:

Kumgang County, a county in Kangwon province, North Korea
Kumgang mountain, a mountain in Kangwon province, North Korea
Kumgang fat minnow, a freshwater fish, in Kangwon province, North Korea
The Geum River, in western South Korea
Geumgang jeondo, a famous landscape painted by Jeong Seon during the reign of King Yeongjo